Xandarovula is a genus of sea snails, marine gastropod mollusks in the family Ovulidae.

Species
Species within the genus Xandarovula include:
Xandarovula aperta (Sowerby, 1949)
Xandarovula hyalina (Lorenz & Fehse, 2009)
Xandarovula patula (Pennant, 1777)
Xandarovula xanthochila (Kuroda, 1928)

References

Ovulidae